Somebody's Gonna Love You is the second studio album by American country music artist Lee Greenwood, released in 1983. It was certified Gold.

Track listing

Personnel
Pete Bordonali - electric guitar
David Briggs - keyboards
Carol Chase - background vocals
Doug Clements - background vocals
Steve Gibson - acoustic guitar
Richard Greene - fiddle
Lee Greenwood - lead vocals
Sherilyn Huffman - background vocals
David Hungate - bass guitar
Larrie Londin - drums
 Weldon Myrick  - steel guitar
Hargus "Pig" Robbins - piano
Jerry Shook - electric guitar
Lisa Silver - background vocals
Andy Statman - mandolin
James Stroud - drums
Diane Tidwell - background vocals
Pete Wade - electric guitar
Jack Williams - bass guitar
Dennis Wilson - background vocals
Reggie Young - electric guitar

Charts

Weekly charts

Year-end charts

Certifications

References

1983 albums
Lee Greenwood albums
Albums produced by Jerry Crutchfield
MCA Records albums